The Economic Zones Development Agency under the Ministry of Economy of Azerbaijan is the managing organization of industrial parks, industrial districts and agricultural parks operating in the country.

History 
The Agency was established according to the Decree No:1257 dated January 22, 2021 of the president of Azerbaijan Ilham Aliyev “On measures to improve the management of industrial parks, industrial districts and agricultural parks” on the basis of Sumgait Chemical Industrial Park LLC.

The Agency's charter was approved by the Decree No:1506 dated December 21, 2021 of the president of the Republic. The Economic Zones Development Agency was state registered on December 28, 2021. Currently, 6 industrial parks, 4 industrial districts and 51 agricultural parks operate under the management of the Agency. Moreover, Vocational Education Center operates under the Economic Zones Development Agency.

Industrial parks 
Industrial parks are areas that have all necessary infrastructure and management institutions, used for competitive production and service provision through application of state of the art technologies for implementation of entrepreneurial activities, triggers efficient operation and development of entrepreneurship. Industrial parks are provided with an extensive infrastructure system at the expense of state funds. Currently, there are 6 industrial parks under the management of the Economic Zones Development Agency.

 Sumgayit Chemical Industrial Park
 Garadagh Industrial Park - was established by the Decree No: 1255 dated June 3, 2015 of the president of the Republic. The territory of the Garadagh Industrial Park, located on the 25th kilometer of the Baku-Astara highway in the Garadagh district of Baku city, is 72 hectares. The areas of activity of the Industrial Park is the production and repair of large, medium and heavy tonnage ships and equipment.
 Pirallahi Industrial Park - was established by the Decree No: 2336 dated September 14, 2016 of the President of the Republic of Azerbaijan Ilham Aliyev. The territory of Pirallahi Industrial Park is 30 hectares. The main area of activity of the Industrial Park is the development of the pharmaceutical industry. Ilham Aliyev attended the opening ceremony of the "Diamed CO" syringe production plant of Pirallahi Industrial Park on May 16, 2019. On December 12, 2019, another resident of the Industrial Park - R-Pharm LLC, an Azerbaijani-Russian joint venture specializing in the production of pharmaceuticals held the opening ceremony. 
 Mingachevir Industrial Park - was established by the Decree No. 1077 of the president of Azerbaijan dated February 26, 2015. The territory of the Mingachevir Industrial Park located in the city of Mingachevir is 26 hectares. The area of activity of Mingachevir Industrial Park is light industry and textile industry. The foundation of Mingachevir Industrial Park was laid on September 21, 2016.  On February 27, 2018, the opening of two yarn production enterprises of "Mingachevir Textile" LLC was held in Mingachevir Industrial Park. 
 Aghdam Industrial Park - was established by the Decree No. 1347 of the president of the Republic dated May 28, 2021. The territory of the Agdam Industrial Park, located in Agdam district, is 190 hectares. On May 28, 2021, the president Ilham Aliyev attended the groundbreaking ceremony of the Aghdam Industrial Park. On February 14, 2022, Ilham Aliyev and Mehriban Aliyeva attended the groundbreaking ceremony of two enterprises in Agdam Industrial Park. 
 "Araz Valley Economic Zone" Industrial Park (located in Jabrayil) - was established by the Decree No. 1453 of the Azerbaijani president dated October 4, 2021. The industrial park located in Jabrayil district covers the territory of 200 hectares. "Araz Valley Economic Zone" Industrial Park is located approximately in the middle of the road from Baku to the border of Turkey through the Zangezur corridor. Thus, it’s 380 km from here to Igdir and 370 km to Baku. On October 4, 2021, Ilham Aliyev laid the foundation of the "Araz Valley Economic Zone" Industrial Park to be established in the East Zangezur economic district.

Industrial Districts 
An industrial district is an area that has the necessary infrastructure for the implementation of entrepreneurial activities and is used by small and medium-sized entrepreneurs for production and service provision. Currently, there are 4 industrial districts in the Economic Zones Administration.

 Hajigabul Industrial District - was established by the Order No: 3127 of the president of Republic dated July 25, 2017. Hajigabul Industrial District covers territory of 60 hectares.
 Masalli Industrial District - was established by the Order No: 2115 of the president of Azerbaijan dated June 13, 2016  and was opened on September 18, 2018. The Industrial district currently has territory of 10 hectares.
 Neftchala Industrial District - was established by the Decree No: 1011 of the Azerbaijani president dated February 2, 2015. On September 24, 2017 was the opening ceremony of the Neftchala Industrial District. The territory of the industrial district is 10 hectares. 
 Sabirabad Industrial District - was established by the Order No: 3407 of Ilham Aliyev dated November 27, 2017  and its foundation was laid by the president on November 28, 2017. The industrial district covers territory of 20.3 hectares.

Agroparks 
There’re 51 agriparks and large farms with a total project value of 2.4 billion manats have been established in 239.3 thousand hectares of land in 32 regions of our republic. 34 of them specialized in plant breeding, 14 in plant and animal breeding, 1 in animal breeding, and 2 in sorting-packing, processing and logistics.

Yevlakh Pilot Agropark - the symbolic opening of the Yevlax Pilot Agropark was held on December 4, 2021 with the participation of the Minister of Economy, Mikayil Jabbarov and the head of the Yevlax District Executive Authority, Anar Taghiyev.

Vocational Education Center 
Under the Economic Zones Development Agency, a modern Vocational Training Center providing training of qualified personnel in industrial specialties was established based on the Decision No: 68 of the Cabinet of Azerbaijan dated April 19, 2013. It was By Decision No: 7, the word "Teaching" in the name of the Center was replaced by the word "Education" and it was renamed Vocational Education Center.

On September 14, 2020, the president of the Republic attended the opening ceremony of the Vocational Education Center.  The Vocational Training Center under the Economic Zones Development Agency is the first vocational training institution established in the country in the territory of the industrial park. The duration of study at the Vocational Education Center is 1 year and admission is carried out through an interview. People with complete secondary education participate in the interview. Also, during the educational process, students who study at the expense of state funds are provided with a scholarship.

References 

Industry in Azerbaijan
Economy of Azerbaijan